Jan Kubiš (24 June 1913 – 18 June 1942) was a Czech soldier, one of a team of Czechoslovak British-trained paratroopers sent to eliminate acting Reichsprotektor (Realm-Protector) of Bohemia and Moravia, SS-Obergruppenführer Reinhard Heydrich, in 1942 as part of Operation Anthropoid. During the attack, Kubiš threw the bomb that mortally wounded Heydrich.

Biography
Jan Kubiš was born in 1913 in Dolní Vilémovice, Moravia in the Austro-Hungarian Empire (present-day Czech Republic). Jan was a Boy Scout.

Jan Kubiš, having previously been an active member of Orel, started his military career as a Czechoslovak army conscript on 1 November 1935 by 31st Infantry Regiment "Arco" in Jihlava. After passing petty officer course and promotion to corporal, Kubiš served some time in Znojmo before being transferred to 34th infantry regiment "Marksman Jan Čapek" in Opava, where he served at guard battalion stationed in Jakartovice. Here, Kubiš reached promotion to platoon sergeant.

During the Czechoslovak mobilisation of 1938, Kubiš served as deputy commander of a platoon in Czechoslovak border fortifications in the Opava area. Following the Munich Agreement and demobilisation, Kubiš was discharged from army on 19 October 1938 and returned to his civilian life, working at a brick factory.

At the eve of World War II, on 16 June 1939, Kubiš fled Czechoslovakia and joined a forming Czechoslovak unit in Kraków, Poland. Soon he was transferred to Algiers, where he entered the French Foreign Legion. He fought in France during the early stage of World War II and received his Croix de Guerre there.

A month after the German victory in the Battle of France, Kubiš fled to Great Britain, where he received training as a paratrooper. The Free Czechoslovaks, as he and other self-exiled Czechoslovaks were called, were stationed at Cholmondeley Castle near Malpas in Cheshire. He and his best friend, Jozef Gabčík, both befriended the Ellison family, from Ightfield, Shropshire, whom they met while in Whitchurch, Shropshire.

In 1941, Kubiš was dropped into Czechoslovakia as part of Operation Anthropoid, where he died following the successful assassination of Reinhard Heydrich.  His remains were buried secretly in a mass grave at the Ďáblice cemetery in Prague. Since this was unknown after World War II, Karel Čurda, the member of their squad who betrayed them to the Nazis, was coincidentally also buried at the cemetery.  However, in 1990 mass graves were excavated and a memorial site with symbolic gravestones was established instead. In 2009, a memorial was built at the place of the attack on Heydrich.

The elimination of Heydrich in Prague

Jozef Gabčík and Jan Kubiš were airlifted along with seven soldiers from Czechoslovakia's army-in-exile in the United Kingdom and two other groups named Silver A and Silver B (who had different missions) by a Royal Air Force Halifax of No. 138 Squadron into Czechoslovakia at 10 pm on 28 December 1941. In Prague, they contacted several families and anti-Nazi organisations who helped them during the preparations for the assassination.

On 27 May 1942, Heydrich had planned to meet Hitler in Berlin. German documents suggest that Hitler intended to transfer Heydrich to German occupied France, where the French resistance was gaining ground. Heydrich would have to pass a section where the Dresden-Prague road merged with a road to the Troja Bridge. The junction, in the Prague suburb of Libeň, was well-suited for the attack because motorists have to slow for a hairpin bend. At 10:30 am, Heydrich proceeded on his daily commute from his home in Panenské Břežany to Prague Castle. Gabčík and Kubiš waited at the tram stop on the curve near Bulovka Hospital in Prague 8-Libeň. As Heydrich's open-topped Mercedes-Benz neared the pair, Gabčík tried to open fire, but his Sten gun jammed. Heydrich ordered his driver, SS-Oberscharführer Klein, to stop the car. As the car braked in front of him, Kubiš threw a modified anti-tank grenade (concealed in a briefcase) at the vehicle; he misjudged his throw. Instead of landing inside the Mercedes, it landed against the rear wheel. Nonetheless, the bomb severely wounded Heydrich when it detonated, its fragments ripping through the right rear fender and embedding shrapnel from the upholstery of the car into Heydrich, causing serious injuries to his left side, with major damage to his diaphragm, spleen and lung, as well as a fractured rib. Kubiš received a minor wound to his face from the shrapnel. As Kubiš staggered against the railings, Klein leapt out of the shattered limousine with a drawn pistol; Kubiš recovered and jumped on his bicycle and pedaled away, scattering passengers spilling from the tram, by firing in the air with his Colt M1903 pistol. Klein tried to fire at him but dazed by the explosion, pressed the magazine release catch and the gun jammed.

A Czech woman went to Heydrich's aid and flagged down a delivery van. Heydrich was first placed in the driver's cab, but complained that the van's movement was causing him pain. He was placed in the back of the van, on his stomach, and taken to the emergency room at Bulovka Hospital. Heydrich had suffered severe injuries to his left side, with major damage to his diaphragm, spleen and lung. He had also fractured a rib. Slanina packed the chest wound, while Walter Diek tried unsuccessfully to remove the splinters. He immediately decided to operate. This was carried out by Diek, Slanina and Hohlbaum. Heydrich was given several blood transfusions. A splenectomy was performed. The chest wound, left lung, and diaphragm were all debrided and the wounds closed. Himmler ordered Dr Karl Gebhardt to fly to Prague to assume care. Despite a fever, Heydrich's recovery appeared to progress well. Theodor Morell, Hitler's personal physician, suggested the use of sulfonamide (an antibacterial drug), but Gebhardt, thinking Heydrich would recover, refused. On 2 June, during a visit by Himmler, Heydrich reconciled himself to his fate by reciting a part of one of his father's operas.

Heydrich slipped into a coma after Himmler's visit and never regained consciousness. He died on 4 June, probably around 04:30. He was 38. The autopsy concluded that he died of sepsis. Heydrich's facial expression as he died betrayed an "uncanny spirituality and entirely perverted beauty, like a renaissance Cardinal," according to Bernhard Wehner, a Kripo police official who investigated the assassination.

Attempted capture of the parachutists

Kubiš and his group were found on 18 June in the Church of St Cyril and St Methodius in Resslova Street in Prague. In a bloody battle that lasted for six hours, Kubiš was seriously wounded by a grenade and was found unconscious. Heinz Pannwitz, the German detective charged with capturing at least one of the perpetrators alive, later recalled his death:

He had tried to use poison on himself but apparently lost consciousness before he could do so. Although he was immediately transferred to the hospital none of the doctors’ attempts to keep him alive succeeded. He died within twenty minutes.

The other parachutists committed suicide to avoid capture after an additional four-hour battle with the SS.

In revenge, the Nazis murdered 24 family members and close relatives of Jan Kubiš in the concentration camp, Mauthausen: his father, both full and half-siblings, including their wives and husbands, cousins, aunts and uncles.

Recognition
Shortly after his successful mission, Kubiš (as well as Gabčík) was promoted to the rank of second lieutenant in memoriam. After the liberation of Czechoslovakia he was further promoted to the rank of staff captain in memoriam. During the celebration of the 60th anniversary of the assassination of Heydrich in 2002, Kubiš was again promoted in memoriam, to the rank of colonel.

Apart from the Czechoslovak Military Cross 1939 and Croix de Guerre (both he received in 1940), Kubiš was posthumously decorated with the Commemorative Medal of the Czechoslovak Army, F, GB (1944), another two Czechoslovak Military Crosses (1942, 1945), King's Commendation for Brave Conduct (1947), Czechoslovak Military Order for Liberty (1949), Military Order of the White Lion "For Victory" 1st Class (1968), Order of Milan Rastislav Štefánik (1992) and Cross of Defence of the Minister of Defence of the Czech Republic (2008).

There are streets named after Jan Kubiš in the cities of Prague (close to the Operation Anthropoid Memorial), Pardubice, Tábor, Třebíč and other places. In 2013 (100th anniversary of Kubiš's birth) a small memorial and museum was open in the house where Jan Kubiš was born. Since 2010 a National memorial and museum dedicated to all heroes related to the assassination of Heydrich is open in the crypt of Ss. Cyril and Methodius Cathedral in Prague.

Coinciding with the release of the 2016 film Anthropoid, campaigners called for Kubiš's and Gabčík's bodies to be identified and exhumed from the mass-grave at the Ďáblice Cemetery, Prague, and to be given a dignified burial fitting "the heroes of anti-Nazi resistance".

Kubiš in film and fiction
Jan Kubiš has been portrayed by Rudolf Jelínek in the 1964 film Atentát, Timothy Bottoms in the film Operation Daybreak and Miroslav Rataj in the film Sokolovo (both released in 1975), Patrik Staněk in the 2011 film Lidice, by Jamie Dornan in the 2016 film Anthropoid and by Jack O'Connell in the 2017 film The Man with the Iron Heart.

See also
 Jozef Gabčík
 Adolf Opálka
 Operation Anthropoid

References

Bibliography

External links
 

1913 births
1942 deaths
People from Třebíč District
People from the Margraviate of Moravia
Czech resistance members
Czechoslovak military personnel of World War II
Scouting and Guiding in the Czech Republic
Operation Anthropoid
Czechoslovak assassins
Czechoslovak military personnel killed in World War II
Resistance members killed by Nazi Germany
Recipients of the Czechoslovak War Cross
Recipients of the Queen's Commendation for Brave Conduct